Košarkaški klub Studentski centar (Abbr. KK Studentski centar), commonly referred to as SC Derby due to sponsorship reasons, is a men's professional basketball club based in Podgorica, Montenegro. The club currently competes in the Montenegrin Basketball League and the ABA League.

History 
The club was founded in 1997 in Podgorica, Montenegro, then part of FR Yugoslavia. The club's founder is the Podgorica Student Dormitory.

In 2015, the club got promoted to the Montenegrin First A League for the 2015–16 season. In 2020, the club joined the Second Adriatic League for the 2020–21 season. The club was league affiliate of Budućnost VOLI.

On 31 August 2021, the club announced a change of their name to SC Derby due to sponsorship reasons.

Players

Current roster

Depth chart

Coaches 

  Slavenko Rakočević (2012–2014)
  Ljubiša Gojšina (2014–2016)
  Slavenko Rakočević (2016–2017)
  Stefan Klikovac (2017–2019)
  Nenad Trajković (2019–2021)
  Andrej Žakelj (2021–present)

Trophies and awards

Trophies 
ABA League Second Division (2nd-tier)
Winner (1): 2020–21

Individual awards
ABA League Second Division MVP Award (1):
  Marko Tejić – 2020–21

ABA League Ideal Starting Five (1):
  Kenan Kamenjaš – 2021–22

Notable players 

  Igor Drobnjak
  Aleksa Ilić
  Nikola Pavličević
  Fedor Žugić
  Kenan Kamenjaš
  Marko Tejić
  Bryon Allen
  Cedrick Bowen

References

External links 
 
 Club Profile at eurobasket.com
 Club Profile at realgm.com

Studenski centar
Studenski centar
Studenski centar
1997 establishments in Montenegro
KK Budućnost